Florida Creek is a stream in Nodaway County in the U.S. state of Missouri. It is a tributary of the Nodaway River.

It is unknown why the name "Florida Creek" was applied to this stream.

See also
List of rivers of Missouri

References

Rivers of Nodaway County, Missouri
Rivers of Missouri